Solwezi District is a district of Zambia, located in North-Western Province. The capital lies at Solwezi. As of the 2000 Zambian Census, the district had a population of 203,797 people.

Population
According to the 2010 national census and household survey, Solwezi District had 239,051 inhabitants. Before 2016, the district had three electoral constituencies; namely Solwezi West, Solwezi Central and Solwezi East. But from the 2016 general election going forward, the Solwezi West constituency now constitutes Kalumbila District while the Solwezi East constituency now constitutes Mushindamo District, leaving Solwezi District with only one constituency (Solwezi Central).

The table below illustrates the population of each Solwezi constituency in 2010.

References

 
Districts of North-Western Province, Zambia